LP1 is the debut studio album by French rock band the Plastiscines. It was released on 12 February 2007 by Virgin France. The album includes the singles "Loser", "Shake (Twist Around the Fire)" and "Rake" which had appeared in 2006 on a compilation of young Parisian bands titled Paris Calling. It reached number 61 on the French chart.

Track listing
"Alchemie"
"Loser"
"Shake (Twist Around the Fire)"
"Mister Driver"
"La règle du jeu"
"Zazie fait de la bicyclette"
"No Way"
"Pop In, Pop Out!"
"Rake"
"Tu as tout prévu"
"Human Rights"
"Lost in Translation"
"Under Control"

Charts

References

2007 debut albums
Plastiscines albums
Virgin Records albums